Dewey County is a county in the western part of the U.S. state of Oklahoma. As of the 2010 census, the population was 4,810. Its county seat is Taloga. The county was created in 1891 as "County D". In an 1898 election, county voters chose the name Dewey, honoring Admiral George Dewey.

History
Lands assigned to the Choctaw and Seminole tribes extended into the area now occupied by Dewey County. Under the Reconstruction Treaties of 1866 the Choctaw and Chickasaw ceded their western domain to the United States. Known as the Leased District, part of the area became the Cheyenne and Arapaho reservation.

Dewey County was created in Oklahoma Territory in 1891 and was opened to non-Indian settlement on April 19, 1892. It was then named as County D by an act of Congress, and did not receive its present name until a general election in 1898. A wooden structure in Taloga was used as the county courthouse from 1909 until 1926, when the present courthouse was built.

Geography

Most of the county is in the Gypsum Hills physiographic region, except that the western one-fourth of the county is in the High Plains region. It is drained by the Canadian and North Canadian Rivers. Canton Lake, built on the Canadian River in 1966, is the only significant lake or reservoir in the county.

Major highways
  U.S. Highway 60
  U.S. Highway 183
  U.S. Highway 270
  U.S. Highway 281
  State Highway 34
 State Highway 47
  State Highway 51

Adjacent counties
 Woodward County (north)
 Major County (north)
 Blaine County (east)
 Custer County (south)
 Roger Mills County (southwest)
 Ellis County (northwest)

Demographics

As of the census of 2000, there were 4,743 people, 1,962 households, and 1,336 families residing in the county.  The population density was 5 people per square mile (2/km2).  There were 2,425 housing units at an average density of 2 per square mile (1/km2).  The racial makeup of the county was 92.16% White, 0.13% Black or African American, 4.64% Native American, 0.06% Asian, 0.02% Pacific Islander, 0.72% from other races, and 2.28% from two or more races.  2.68% of the population were Hispanic or Latino of any race.

There were 1,962 households, out of which 26.70% had children under the age of 18 living with them, 59.80% were married couples living together, 5.00% had a female householder with no husband present, and 31.90% were non-families. 30.00% of all households were made up of individuals, and 16.40% had someone living alone who was 65 years of age or older.  The average household size was 2.35 and the average family size was 2.93.

In the county, the population was spread out, with 23.30% under the age of 18, 7.10% from 18 to 24, 22.90% from 25 to 44, 25.70% from 45 to 64, and 21.00% who were 65 years of age or older.  The median age was 43 years. For every 100 females there were 94.90 males.  For every 100 females age 18 and over, there were 91.30 males.

The median income for a household in the county was $28,172, and the median income for a family was $36,114. Males had a median income of $26,675 versus $18,548 for females. The per capita income for the county was $15,806.  About 11.40% of families and 15.00% of the population were below the poverty line, including 17.60% of those under age 18 and 15.80% of those age 65 or over.

Politics

Economy
The county economy has centered on agriculture since it began to be settled. Principal crops have included corn, cotton, wheat, broomcorn, Kaffir corn, and oats. Truck farmers in the eastern part of the county grew tomatoes, watermelons, apples, blackberries, and other small fruits. Livestock (cattle, horses, mules, sheep and goats) raising had become important by the 1930s. These products were still economically important by the turn of the 21st Century.

Mineral extraction included oil and gas production (mainly in the 1940s and 1950s), bentonite, gypsum, clay and sand. In 2000, Dewey County had only two manufacturing businesses that employed more than ten people.

Communities

 Camargo
 Fay
 Leedey
 Lenora
 Oakwood
 Putnam
 Seiling
 Taloga (county seat)
 Vici

See also
 National Register of Historic Places listings in Dewey County, Oklahoma

References

External links
 Encyclopedia of Oklahoma History and Culture - Dewey County
 Oklahoma Digital Maps: Digital Collections of Oklahoma and Indian Territory

 
1891 establishments in Oklahoma Territory
Populated places established in 1891